The Eagle Creek Covered Bridge, in Byrd Township near Decatur, Ohio, was a historic Smith truss covered bridge built in 1875.  Also known as the Bowman Bridge, it was listed on the National Register of Historic Places in 1975.

Before its destruction it was the longest single-span covered bridge in Ohio.  It was one of only 15 Smith truss bridges then surviving in the state, this like most others built by the Smith Bridge Co.

It was washed away in 1997.

References

Covered bridges in Ohio
National Register of Historic Places in Brown County, Ohio
Bridges completed in 1875